ATP-binding cassette super-family B member 6, mitochondrial is a protein that in humans is encoded by the ABCB6 gene.

The membrane-associated protein encoded by this gene is a member of the superfamily of ATP-binding cassette (ABC) transporters.  ABC proteins transport various molecules across extra- and intra-cellular membranes.  ABC genes are divided into seven distinct subfamilies (ABC1, MDR/TAP, MRP, ALD, OABP, GCN20, White).  This protein is a member of the MDR/TAP subfamily.  Members of the MDR/TAP subfamily are involved in multidrug resistance as well as antigen presentation.  This half-transporter likely plays a role in mitochondrial function.  Localized to 2q26, this gene is considered a candidate gene for  Dyschromatosis Universalis Hereditaria, a disorder of skin pigment metabolism. The protein also carries the Lan antigen, which defines the Lan blood group system.

See also
 ATP-binding cassette transporter

References

Further reading

External links 
 
  
 
 

ATP-binding cassette transporters